Ninewells is an area of Dundee, Scotland, known for its hospital.

References

Areas of Dundee